1876 was the 90th season of cricket in England since the foundation of Marylebone Cricket Club (MCC). Gloucestershire reclaimed the unofficial "Champion County" title. A relatively dry summer and improvements to pitches via the heavy roller saw several batting records broken.

Champion County

 Gloucestershire

Playing record (by county)

Leading batsmen (qualification 20 innings)

Leading bowlers (qualification 1,000 balls)

Events
 14 January: Formation of Essex County Cricket Club at a meeting in the Shire Hall, Chelmsford. There had been previous county organisations in Essex going back to the 18th century, mainly around the famous Hornchurch club.
 20 June: At the soon-to-be-built-on Prince's Cricket Ground, Oxford University made the first total of 600 in a first-class match when they scored 612 against Middlesex with William Game top scoring with 141.
 27 June: Game became the first Oxonian to score a century against Cambridge, scoring 109
 In August, W.G. Grace made his highest first-class score of 344, for MCC v Kent at Canterbury in August. Two days later he made 177 for Gloucestershire v Notts, and two days after that scored 318 not out for Gloucestershire v Yorkshire, the latter two innings against counties with exceptionally strong bowling attacks. Thus in three consecutive innings Grace scored 839 runs, and was only out twice. Grace's 344 was the first triple century scored in first class cricket. William Ward's 278 scored in 1820 had stood as a record for 56 years; within a week Grace had bettered it twice.
 Grace also become the first player to score 2000 runs and take 100 wickets in a season: 2622 runs and 130 wickets in 26 matches. His feat was not equalled until Charlie Townsend in 1899.
 Alfred Shaw became the first bowler to bowl 10,000 balls in a season, a feat he was to repeat in 1878 but was not equalled again until J.T. Hearne in 1896. His actual total of 10,526 balls was not bettered until Tich Freeman's record season in 1928.

Notes
An unofficial seasonal title sometimes proclaimed by consensus of media and historians prior to December 1889 when the official County Championship was constituted.  Although there are ante-dated claims prior to 1873, when residence qualifications were introduced, it is only since that ruling that any quasi-official status can be ascribed.

References

Annual reviews
 John Lillywhite’s Cricketer’s Companion (Green Lilly), Lillywhite, 1877
 James Lillywhite’s Cricketers' Annual (Red Lilly), Lillywhite, 1877
 John Wisden's Cricketers' Almanack, 1877

External links
 CricketArchive – season summaries

1876 in English cricket
English cricket seasons in the 19th century